Nate is a given name, frequently used as a  diminutive of Nathan, Nathanael or Nathaniel.

People

Arts and entertainment 
Nate Albert (born 1970), American musician best known as a guitarist for ska-core band The Mighty Mighty Bosstones
Nate Mooney (born 1971) American actor
Nate Barnes, American singer
Nate Berkus (born 1971), American interior designer, author, TV host and television personality
Nate Corddry (born 1977), American actor
Nate Dogg (1969–2011), American rapper, singer, and actor
Nate Kelley (born 1978), original drummer and backing vocalist for the progressive rock band Shabutie
Nate Richert (born 1978), American actor and musician
Nate Parker (born 1979), American actor and musical performer
Nate Ruess (born 1982), American singer-songwriter and musician, best known as the lead vocalist of indie rock band Fun
Nate Walcott (born 1978), American musical composer, arranger, and multi-instrumentalist

Politicians 
Nate Bell (born 1969), American politician
Nate Gentry, American politician
Nate Steel, American politician

Sports 
Nate Allen (cornerback) (born 1948), former National Football League cornerback
Nate Allen (safety) (born 1987), American football safety
Nate Archibald (born 1948), American Hall of Fame National Basketball Association player
Nate Barragar (1906–1985), American collegiate and professional football player
Nate Becker (born 1996), American football player
Nate Blackwell (born 1965), American retired basketball player
Nate Bowman (1943–1984), American basketball player
Nate Brooks (American football) (born 1996), American football player
Nate Burkey (born 1985), American-Filipino association football player
Nate Byham (born 1988), American football tight end
Nate Chandler (born 1989), American football offensive tackle
Nate Clements (born 1979), American former National Football League player
Nate Colbert (1946–2023), American baseball player
Nate Collins (born 1987), American football defensive tackle
Nate Darling (born 1998), Canadian basketball player
Nate Davis (quarterback) (born 1987), American football quarterback
Nate Davis (offensive lineman) (born 1996), American football player
Nate Diaz (born 1985), American mixed martial artist and UFC fighter
Nate Duffy, American football coach in the United States
Nate Dusing (born 1978), American former competition swimmer, Olympic medalist and former world champion
Nate Ebner (born 1998), American National Football League player and Olympic rugby player  
Nate Erdmann (born 1973), American former professional basketball player
Nate Fish (born 1980), American baseball player and coach
Nate Freiman (born 1986), American baseball player
Nate Garner (born 1985), American football offensive tackle
Nate Grimes (born 1996), American basketball player in the Israeli Basketball Premier League
Nate Hairston (born 1994), American football player
Nate Hall (born 1996), American football player
Nate Harvey (born 1996), American football player
Nate Herbig (born 1994), American football player
Nate Higgs, American/Spanish basketball player and coach
Nate Hinton (born 1999), American basketball player
Nate Hobbs (born 1999), American football player
Nate Hobgood-Chittick (born 1974), American football player
Nate Holland (born 1978), American snowboarder
Nate Huffman (1975–2015), American basketball player
Nate Hybl (born 1979), American football player
Nate Irving (born 1988), American football player
Nate Kaeding (born 1982), American football player
Nate Landman (born 1998), American football player
Nate Libby, American politician
Nate Livings (born 1982), American football player
Nate Lubell (1916–2006), American Olympic fencer
Nate McCrary (born 1999), American football player
Nate McLouth (born 1981), American baseball player
Nate McMillan (born 1964), NBA coach
Nate Meadors (born 1997), American football player
Nate Miller (boxer) (born 1963), American boxer
Nate Miller (defensive back) (born 1958), American football player
Nate Miller (offensive lineman) (born 1971), American football player
Nate Mulberg, American baseball coach
Nate Odomes (born 1965), American football player
Nate Palmer (born 1989), American football linebacker
Nate Potter (born 1988), American football offensive tackle
Nate Roberts (skier) (born 1982), American freestyle skier
Nate Robinson (born 1984), American professional basketball player
Nate Schierholtz (born 1984), American professional baseball outfielder
Nate Sestina (born 1997), American basketball player in the Israeli Basketball Premier League
Nate Silver (quarterback), American football player
Nate Singleton (born 1968), American former football wide receiver
Nate Smith (catcher) (born 1935), retired American baseball player
Nate Smith (golfer) (born 1983), American golfer
Nate Solder (born 1988), American football offensive lineman
Nate Stanley (born 1997), American football player
Nate Stupar (born 1988), American football linebacker
Nate Thurmond (1941-2016), American basketball player
Nate Trewyn (born 1996), American football player
Nate Turner (born 1969), American former football running back
Nate Washington (born 1983), American football wide receiver
Nate Watt (1889–1968), American film director
Nate Wayne (born 1975), American former football linebacker
Nate Wozniak (born 1994), American football player

Other professions 
Nate Silver (born 1978), American statistician and writer

Fictional characters 
Nate the Great, the main character of the children's detective stories series of the same name
Nate River in the manga series Death Note
Nate N. Nickerson in NBC's The Office
Nate Potato in the 2011 British animated short series Small Potatoes
Nate Roberts in the British TV series The Bill
Nate Salinger in the American soap opera One Life to Live
Nate Tenbury-Newent in the British soap opera Hollyoaks
Nate Williamsen, a lead character in Nate and Hayes, a 1983 swashbuckling adventure film
Nate Wright, the main character in the comic strip Big Nate
Nathan Young in the British sci-fi TV show Misfits
Uncle Nate, a character in 1998 American comedy movie My Giant
Nate Buxaplenty, character form TV series The Fairly OddParents: Fairly Odder
Nathan "Nate" Shelley, a character from the AppleTV+ show, Ted Lasso.

See also 
Nat (disambiguation)
Nate (disambiguation)

English masculine given names
Hypocorisms